Scissors, Paper, Rock! is the debut studio album by Australian comedy band The Axis of Awesome, released on 2 January 2008.

Track listing

Personnel
Jordan Raskopoulos – vocals
Lee Naimo – guitar, vocals
Benny Davis – keyboards, vocals

References

2008 debut albums
The Axis of Awesome albums